Karunesh ("God of Compassion"; born Bruno Reuter in 1956) is a German-born new-age and ambient musician. His music has strong Indian, African, Australian, Native American/Aboriginal music of Canada, and Middle Eastern influences prevalent throughout with liberal use of Indian instruments such as the sitar along with violin, didgeridoo, bouzuki, Native American flute, Chinese temple flutes, tamboura, bamboo flute, and various world percussion instruments.

Karunesh was born in Cologne, Germany in 1956. Although he had been drawn to music as a child and played in bands as a teenager, he chose to study graphic design as a career. However, after obtaining his degree, Karunesh was involved in a serious motorcycle accident. His brush with death prompted him to choose music as a career instead of graphic design. He rethought his life and traveled to India in 1979, where he met Osho in his ashram in Pune. He became initiated and took on a new spiritual name, Karunesh (meaning "compassion" in Sanskrit).

Back in Germany, Karunesh lived in the Rajneesh commune of Hamburg for five years. There he came in contact with musicians from all over the world and developed an eclectic style of music.

In 1985, Karunesh released his first album, entitled Sounds of the Heart. His next albums were Colours of Light (1987) and Sky's Beyond (1989). His additional albums include Heart Chakra Meditation (1992), Secrets of Life (1995), and Zen Breakfast (2001).

Karunesh has lived on Maui, in the U.S. state of Hawaii, since 1992.

Discography

Solo albums

Compilations released by Plusquam New Age

See also 
List of ambient music artists

References

External links

Video
 

1956 births
Living people
German electronic musicians
Ambient musicians
New-age musicians
German expatriates in India
Performers of Hindu music